Campofranco (Campufrancu in Sicilian) is a comune (municipality) in the Province of Caltanissetta in the Italian region Sicily, located about  southeast of Palermo and about  west of Caltanissetta.

Campofranco borders the following municipalities: Aragona, Casteltermini, Grotte, Milena, Sutera.

References

External links
 Official website

Cities and towns in Sicily